The Vicar of Vejlby may refer to

 The Rector of Veilbye, 1829 crime mystery by Steen Steensen Blicher
 The Vicar of Vejlby (1922 film), film based on the novel
 The Vicar of Vejlby (1931 film), film based on the novel